Yi jiang chun shui xiang dong liu is the Chinese title of the film:
The Spring River Flows East (dir. Cai Chusheng, Zheng Junli, 1947) 

And its remake, the television series:
The River Flows Eastwards (dir. Jiang Haiyang, 2004)